The assistant commandant of the Marine Corps (ACMC) is the second highest-ranking officer in the United States Marine Corps, and serves as a deputy for the commandant of the Marine Corps (CMC). Before 1946, the title was known as the assistant to the commandant.

The assistant commandant is nominated for appointment by the president and must be confirmed via majority vote by the Senate. If the commandant is absent or is unable to perform his duties, then the assistant commandant assumes the duties and responsibilities of the commandant. For this reason, the assistant commandant is appointed to a rank equal to the sitting commandant; since 1971, each assistant commandant has been, by statute, a four-star general, making it the most common rank held among marines serving this position. Additionally, he may perform other duties that the CMC assigns to him. Historically, the assistant commandant has served for two to three years. In recent decades, the assistant commandant has frequently been a Marine aviator. James F. Amos is the first aviator to serve as the assistant commandant and then be promoted to commandant.

The 36th and current assistant commandant is Eric M. Smith, who took office on October 8, 2021, when Gary L. Thomas relinquished the office. The first marine to hold the billet as the "assistant to the commandant" was Eli K. Cole (Allen H. Turnage being the last), while Lemuel C. Shepherd Jr. was the first to hold it as the "assistant commandant".

List of appointees

Assistants to the commandant of the Marine Corps
Before the official title of "Assistant Commandant of the Marine Corps" was adopted in 1946, the title of the position was known as "Assistant to the Commandant" and before 1918, known only as "Duty in the Office of the Commandant". No records exist before the outbreak of World War I about this position, possibly because the Commandant likely had only administrative staff and no deputy.

The first assistant to the commandant was Lieutenant Colonel (from 1914 Colonel) Eli K. Cole, who assumed the position on April 29, 1911. From April 29, 1911, to October 16, 1946, 19 men were assigned to assist the commandant, including five who later became commandant: John A. Lejeune, Wendell C. Neville, Ben H. Fuller, John H. Russell Jr., and Alexander A. Vandegrift.

|}

Assistant commandants of the Marine Corps
In 1946, Congress established the position of "assistant commandant of the Marine Corps" and since then, 31 men have held the position. Major General Lemuel C. Shepherd Jr. was the first to hold the billet and went on to become commandant, as well as six others: Randolph M. Pate, Leonard F. Chapman Jr., Robert H. Barrow, Paul X. Kelley, James F. Amos and Joseph Dunford.

As with the commandant, the assistant commandant of the Marine Corps is appointed by the president based on advice and consent of the Senate and, once appointed, will be promoted to the grade of general. The duties of the assistant commandant include such authority and duties as the commandant – and with the approval of the secretary of the Navy – may delegate to or prescribe for him. Orders issued by the assistant commandant in performing such duties have the same effect as those issued by the commandant. When there is a vacancy in the office of the commandant of the Marine Corps, or during the absence or disability of the commandant, the assistant commandant shall perform the duties of the commandant until a successor is appointed or the absence or disability ceases.

|}

Timeline

See also
 Military Secretary to the Commandant of the Marine Corps
 Commandant of the Marine Corps
 Sergeant Major of the Marine Corps
Vice Chief of Staff of the Army
 Vice Chief of Naval Operations
 Vice Chief of Staff of the Air Force
 Vice Chief of Space Operations
Vice Commandant of the Coast Guard

References
General
 
 

Specific

 
United States Marine Corps leadership
United States Marine Corps lists
Articles which contain graphical timelines